The 1897 Dartmouth football team represented Dartmouth College in the 1897 college football season.

Dartmouth played only seven games during the 1897 season, the fewest of any year under head coach William Wurtenburg. The squad completed the year with a mediocre 4–3 record. Despite going 2–0 in conference games, the team lost three consecutive games in major shutouts. The season began with a shutout of Phillips Exeter Academy, but quickly turned for the worse. Harvard returned to Dartmouth's schedule and defeated them 13–0. The loss was followed by blowout defeats by Penn and Princeton, with Dartmouth losing by combined score of 64–0. As with the previous year, the season concluded with a defeat of the Newton Athletic Club.

Several members of the team would later become college football coaches, including John B. Eckstorm, Joseph Wentworth, Frank Cavanaugh, David Carr MacAndrew, Joseph H. Edwards, Fred Crolius, and Charles J. Boyle.

Schedule

References

Dartmouth
Dartmouth Big Green football seasons
Dartmouth football